The joule (symbol: J) is the unit of energy in the International System of Units (SI). It is equal to the amount of work done when a force of 1 newton displaces a mass through a distance of 1 metre in the direction of the force applied. It is also the energy dissipated as heat when an electric current of one ampere passes through a resistance of one ohm for one second. It is named after the English physicist James Prescott Joule (1818–1889).

Definition
In terms of SI base units and in terms of SI derived units with special names, the joule is defined as

One joule can also be defined by any of the following:
 The work required to move an electric charge of one coulomb through an electrical potential difference of one volt, or one coulomb-volt (C⋅V). This relationship can be used to define the volt.
 The work required to produce one watt of power for one second, or one watt-second (W⋅s) (compare kilowatt-hour, which is 3.6 megajoules). This relationship can be used to define the watt.

History
The cgs system had been declared official in 1881, at the first International Electrical Congress.
The erg was adopted as its unit of energy in 1882.
The naming of the unit in honour of James Prescott Joule (1818–1889), at the time retired but still living (aged 63), is due to Siemens:
"Such a heat unit, if found acceptable, might with great propriety, I think, be called the Joule, after the man who has done so much to develop the dynamical theory of heat."

At the second International Electrical Congress, on 31 August 1889, the joule was officially adopted alongside the watt and the quadrant (later renamed to henry).
Joule died in the same year, on 11 October 1889.
At the fourth congress (1893), the "international ampere" and "international ohm" were defined, with slight changes in the specifications for their measurement, with the "international joule" being the unit derived from them.

In 1935, the International Electrotechnical Commission (as the successor organisation of the International Electrical Congress) adopted the "Giorgi system", which by virtue of assuming a defined value for the magnetic constant also implied a redefinition of the Joule. The Giorgi system was approved by the International Committee for Weights and Measures in 1946. The joule was now no longer defined based on electromagnetic unit, but instead as the unit of work performed by one unit of force (at the time not yet named newton)
over the distance of 1 metre. The joule was explicitly intended as the unit of energy to be used in both electromagnetic and mechanical contexts. The ratification of the definition at the ninth General Conference on Weights and Measures, in 1948,
added the specification that the joule was also to be preferred as the unit of heat in the context of calorimetry, thereby officially deprecating the use of the calorie. 
This definition was the direct precursor of the joule as adopted in the modern International System of Units in 1960.

The definition of the joule as J = kg⋅m2⋅s−2 has remained unchanged since 1946, but the joule as a derived unit has inherited changes in the definitions of the   second (in 1960 and 1967), the metre (in 1983) and the kilogram (in 2019).

Practical examples 
One joule represents (approximately):
 The heat required to raise the temperature of 0.239 g of water from 0 °C to 1 °C, or from 32 °F to 33.8 °F.
 The typical energy released as heat by a person at rest every 1/60 s.
 The kinetic energy of a  human moving very slowly.
 The food energy (kcal) in slightly more than half of a sugar crystal (/crystal).

Multiples 

   is about one electronvolt. The minimal energy needed to change a bit at around room temperature – approximately  – is given by the Landauer limit.
   is about the kinetic energy of a flying mosquito.
  The Large Hadron Collider (LHC) produces collisions of the microjoule order (7 TeV) per particle.
  Nutritional food labels in most countries express energy in kilojoules (kJ).
   is about the chemical energy of combusting  of petroleum. 2 GJ is about the Planck energy unit.
About  of energy was released by Little Boy.
  The 2011 Tōhoku earthquake and tsunami in Japan had  of energy according to its rating of 9.0 on the moment magnitude scale.
  The zettajoule is somewhat more than the amount of energy required to heat the Baltic sea by 1 °C, assuming properties similar to those of pure water.
  The yottajoule is a little less than the amount of energy required to heat the Indian Ocean by 1 °C, assuming properties similar to those of pure water.

Conversions

1 joule is equal to (approximately unless otherwise stated):
  (exactly)
 
  (gram calories)
  (food calories)
 
  (foot-pound)
  (foot-poundal)
  (kilowatt-hour)
  (watt-hour)
  (litre-atmosphere)
  (by way of mass–energy equivalence)
  (exactly) 

Units defined exactly in terms of the joule include:
 1 thermochemical calorie = 4.184J
 1 International Table calorie = 4.1868J
 1W⋅h = 3600J (or 3.6kJ)
 1kW⋅h =  (or 3.6MJ)
 1W⋅s = 
 1ton TNT =

Newton-metre and torque

In mechanics, the concept of force (in some direction) has a close analogue in the concept of torque (about some angle):

A result of this similarity is that the SI unit for torque is the newton-metre, which works out algebraically to have the same dimensions as the joule, but they are not interchangeable. The General Conference on Weights and Measures has given the unit of energy the name joule, but has not given the unit of torque any special name, hence it is simply the newton-metre (N⋅m) – a compound name derived from its constituent parts. The use of newton-metres for torque and joules for energy is helpful to avoid misunderstandings and miscommunications.

The distinction may be seen also in the fact that energy is a scalar quantity – the dot product of a force vector and a displacement vector. By contrast, torque is a vector – the cross product of a force vector and a distance vector. Torque and energy are related to one another by the equation

where E is energy, τ is (the vector magnitude of) torque, and θ is the angle swept (in radians). Since plane angles are dimensionless, it follows that torque and energy have the same dimensions.

Watt-second
A watt-second (symbol W s or W⋅s) is a derived unit of energy equivalent to the joule. The watt-second is the energy equivalent to the power of one watt sustained for one second.  While the watt-second is equivalent to the joule in both units and meaning, there are some contexts in which the term "watt-second" is used instead of "joule", such as in the rating of photographic electronic flash units.

See also 
 Fluence
 Reciprocal joules

Notes

References

External links 
 

James Prescott Joule
SI derived units
Units of energy